Liniaxis is a genus of medium-sized sea snails, marine gastropod mollusks in the subfamily Coralliophilinae, the coral snails, within the family Muricidae, the murex snails and rock snails.

Species
Species within the genus Liniaxis include:
 Liniaxis elaborata A. & H. Adams, 1863, a synonym of Coralliophila elaborata (H. Adams & A. Adams, 1863)
 Liniaxis elongata C. F. Laseron, 1955, this may be a synonym of, or a closely related species to the Mipus nodosus complex  (A. Adams, 1854) 
 Liniaxis sertata (Hedley, 1903), a synonym of Coralliophila sertata (Hedley, 1903)

References
 The Paleobiology Database: Liniaxis

Further reading 
 Powell A. W. B., New Zealand Mollusca, William Collins Publishers Ltd, Auckland, New Zealand 1979 
 J. J. Sepkoski. 2002. A compendium of fossil marine animal genera. Bulletins of American Paleontology 363:1-560

 
Extant Pleistocene first appearances